Letpao Haokip is an Indian politician and member of the BJP. Haokip was first elected as a member of the Manipur Legislative Assembly from Chandel constituency in Chandel District as a National People's Party candidate in 2017. In 2021 he joined BJP. He contested from Tengnoupal Constituency as BJP Candidate in 2022.  He was Minister for Irrigation & Flood Control and Youth Affairs & Sports (2017-2022) in Biren Singh government.

History
 Elected MLA from 42 Tengnoupal(ST) A/C, 12th Manipur Legislative Assembly 2022.
 Elected MLA from 41 Chandel(ST) A/C, 11th Manipur Legislative Assembly 2017.

References

Living people
National People's Party (India) politicians
Manipur politicians
Manipur MLAs 2017–2022
Year of birth missing (living people)
Manipur MLAs 2022–2027